Last Polka in Nancy? is the second album by the free jazz quartet Center of the World, consisting of saxophonist Frank Wright, pianist Bobby Few, bassist Alan Silva and drummer Muhammad Ali. It was recorded live in 1973 at the Nancy Jazz Pulsations Festival and released on the French Center of the World label. The album was reissued on CD in 1999 by Fractal with a previously unreleased performance from a 1978 reunion.

Reception

In his review for AllMusic, Thom Jurek states "This is a freewheeling exorcism of a set with spar but well placed dynamic sequences that accent all the textures possible when the boundaries to expression are gone."

Track listing
 "Winter Echoes" (Few) –  14:48  
 "Guanna Dance, Part 1" (Silva) –  4:04
 "Guanna Dance, Part 2" (Silva) –  11:34
 "Thinking of Monk" (Few) –  1:21
 "Doing the Polka" (Few) –  10:16

Bonus track on Fractal reissue CD
Recorded live 1978 at Neue Anta, Detmold
"Two Birds with One Stone" (Wright) –  18:57

Personnel

Frank Wright – tenor saxophone
Bobby Few – piano
Alan Silva – bass
Muhammad Ali – drums

References

1973 live albums
Frank Wright (jazz musician) live albums